Martina Hingis defeated Jeon Mi-ra in the final, 7–5, 6–4 to win the girls' singles tennis title at the 1994 Wimbledon Championships.

Seeds

  Amanda Wainwright (first round)
  Dally Randriantefy (second round)
  Melanie Schnell (quarterfinals)
  Annabel Ellwood (third round)
  Jeon Mi-ra (final)
  Zuzana Nemšáková (semifinals)
  Tatiana Panova (third round)
  Martina Hingis (champion)
  Henrieta Nagyová (first round)
  Sonya Jeyaseelan (third round)
  Amélie Castéra (semifinals)
 n/a
  Yvette Basting (second round)
  Petra Mandula (second round)
  Siobhan Drake-Brockman (second round)
  Miriam D'Agostini (first round)

Draw

Finals

Top half

Section 1

Section 2

Bottom half

Section 3

Section 4

References

External links

Girls' Singles
Wimbledon Championship by year – Girls' singles